Blake is an unincorporated community located in Owsley County, Kentucky, United States. Its post office  is closed.

References

Unincorporated communities in Owsley County, Kentucky
Unincorporated communities in Kentucky